Test No. 6 is the codename for China's first test of a three-staged thermonuclear device and, also its sixth nuclear weapons test. It was a part of the "Two Bombs, One Satellite" program.

Development 
The device was detonated at Lop Nur Test Base, or often dubbed as Lop Nur Nuclear Weapon Test Base, in Malan, Xinjiang, on 17 June 1967. With successful testing of this three-stage thermonuclear device, China became the fourth country to have successfully developed a thermonuclear weapon after the United States, Soviet Union and the United Kingdom. It was dropped from a Xian H-6 (Chinese manufactured Tu-16) of the 36th Air Division and was parachute-retarded for an airburst at 2960 meters. The bomb was a three-stage device with a boosted U-235 primary and U-238 pusher. The yield was 3.3 megatons.

The film of the prior 1966 tests have been released, as well as a unidentified later test. 

It was a fully functional, full-scale, three-stage hydrogen bomb, tested just 32 months after China had made its first fission device. It remains to date the fastest of any country to successfully develop this capability.

China had received extensive technical help from the Soviet Union to jump-start their nuclear program, but by 1960, the rift between the Soviet Union and China had become so great that the Soviet Union ceased all assistance to China and refused to help the Chinese government with their nuclear program.

The goal of China was to produce a thermonuclear device of at least a megaton in yield that could be dropped by an aircraft or carried by a ballistic missile.  Several explosions to test thermonuclear weapon designs, characteristics and yield boosting preceded the thermonuclear test.

See also
 Two Bombs, One Satellite
 816 Nuclear Military Plant
 List of Chinese nuclear tests
 List of states with nuclear weapons
 Teller–Ulam design

References

Citations

Sources 

 Books
 Norris, Robert, Burrows, Andrew, Fieldhouse, Richard. Nuclear Weapons Databook, Volume V, British, French and Chinese Nuclear Weapons. San Francisco, CA: Westview Press, 1994. .

Cold War weapons of China
Chinese nuclear weapons testing
1967 in China
1967 in military history
20th century in Xinjiang
June 1967 events in Asia